The I channel (KCa3.1), which has a conductance of 20–80 pS, is expressed mainly in peripheral tissues such as those of the haematopoietic system, colon, placenta, lung and pancreas. The KCa3.1 channel in red blood cells was the first Ca2+–sensitive K+ channel to be identified and it has been implicated in a wide range of cell functions, including vasodilation of the microvasculature, K+ flux across endothelial cells of brain capillaries and the phagocytic activity of neutrophils. KCa3.1 is of primary importance in the relationship between K+ channels and cell proliferation.

In the latter case, a human hIKCa1 gene encodes the channel found in T cells, which is responsible for the hyperpolarization that is required to keep Ca2+ flowing into the cell through the ICRAC channels.

In comparison with the large-conductance (BK) channels, KCa3.1 is much more sensitive to Ca2+ and can thus respond to the global level of Ca2+. This high affinity for Ca2+ depends upon four resident calmodulin molecules tightly bound to the cytoplasmic tails of the four pore-forming α-subunits. Before the channel can open, Ca2+ must bind to each of the calmodulins to induce the co-operative conformational change that opens the gate, which explains why this process has a Hill coefficient of 4. This Ca2+–induced gating process resembles that which has been described for the small-conductance (SK) channels. The fact that calmodulin is prebound to its effector enables the channels to respond to Ca2+ very quickly.

The PtdIns3P signaling cassette may play a role in regulating the activity of KCa3.1. If this signaling lipid is hydrolysed by MTMR6, which is one of the myotubularins, there is a decrease in the activity of the Ca2+–activated channel.

References

Potassium channels
Electrophysiology
Integral membrane proteins